The Little River is a tributary of the Canadian River,  long, in central Oklahoma, United States. Via the Canadian and Arkansas rivers, it is part of the watershed of the Mississippi River.

The Little River rises in Moore in northwestern Cleveland County and flows generally southeastwardly through Pottawatomie, Seminole and Hughes counties. In Cleveland County, the river is dammed to form Lake Thunderbird. Downstream of the lake, several sections of the river have been straightened and channelized.

See also
List of Oklahoma rivers

References

Columbia Gazetteer of North America entry
DeLorme (2003).  Oklahoma Atlas & Gazetteer.  Yarmouth, Maine: DeLorme.  .

External links
Pilot Study of Natural Attenuation of Arsenic in Well Water Discharged to the Little River above Lake Thunderbird, Norman, Oklahoma, 2012 United States Geological Survey

Rivers of Oklahoma
Rivers of Cleveland County, Oklahoma
Rivers of Hughes County, Oklahoma
Rivers of Pottawatomie County, Oklahoma
Rivers of Seminole County, Oklahoma